Gathi-Loumbo (or Gatié Loumo on some maps) is a village and seat of the commune of Farimaké in the Cercle of Youwarou in the Mopti Region of southern-central Mali.

References

Populated places in Mopti Region